Non-smooth mechanics is a modeling approach in mechanics which does not require the time evolutions of the positions and of the velocities to be smooth functions anymore. Due to possible impacts, the velocities of the mechanical system are even allowed to undergo jumps at certain time instants in order to fulfill the kinematical restrictions. Consider for example a rigid model of a ball which falls on the ground. Just before the impact between ball and ground, the ball has non-vanishing pre-impact velocity. At the impact time instant, the velocity must jump to a post-impact velocity which is at least zero, or else penetration would occur. Non-smooth mechanical models are often used in contact dynamics.

See also
Contact dynamics
Unilateral contact
Jean Jacques Moreau

References
Acary V., Brogliato, B. Numerical Methods for Nonsmooth Dynamical Systems. Applications in Mechanics and Electronics. Springer Verlag, LNACM 35, Heidelberg, 2008.
Brogliato B. Nonsmooth Mechanics. Models, Dynamics and Control. Communications and Control Engineering Series, Springer-Verlag, London, 2016 (3rd Ed.)
 Demyanov, V.F., Stavroulakis, G.E., Polyakova, L.N., Panagiotopoulos, P.D.  "Quasidifferentiability and Nonsmooth Modelling in Mechanics, Engineering and Economics", Springer 1996.
 Yang Gao, David, Ogden, Ray W., Stavroulakis, Georgios E. (Eds.) "Nonsmooth/Nonconvex Mechanics Modeling, Analysis and Numerical Methods", Springer 2001
Glocker, Ch. Dynamik von Starrkoerpersystemen mit Reibung und Stoessen, volume 18/182 of VDI Fortschrittsberichte Mechanik/Bruchmechanik. VDI Verlag, Düsseldorf, 1995
Glocker Ch. and Studer C. Formulation and preparation for Numerical Evaluation of Linear Complementarity Systems. Multibody System Dynamics 13(4):447-463, 2005
Jean M. The non-smooth contact dynamics method. Computer Methods in Applied mechanics and Engineering 177(3-4):235-257, 1999
 Mistakidis, E.S., Stavroulakis, Georgios E. "Nonconvex Optimization in Mechanics Algorithms, Heuristics and Engineering Applications by the F.E.M.", Springer, 1998
Moreau J.J.  Unilateral Contact and Dry Friction in Finite Freedom Dynamics, volume 302 of  Non-smooth Mechanics and Applications, CISM Courses and Lectures. Springer, Wien, 1988
Pfeiffer F., Foerg M. and Ulbrich H. Numerical aspects of non-smooth multibody dynamics. Comput. Methods Appl. Mech. Engrg 195(50-51):6891-6908, 2006
Potra F.A., Anitescu M., Gavrea B. and Trinkle J. A linearly implicit trapezoidal method for integrating stiff multibody dynamics with contacts, joints and friction. Int. J. Numer. Meth. Engng 66(7):1079-1124, 2006
Stewart D.E. and Trinkle J.C. An Implicit Time-Stepping Scheme for Rigid Body Dynamics with Inelastic Collisions and Coulomb Friction. Int. J. Numer. Methods Engineering 39(15):2673-2691, 1996

Mechanics
Dynamical systems